Goregaon ([ɡoːɾeɡaːʋ]) is a suburb of Mumbai city, in the Mumbai Suburban district of India. It has a railway station on the Mumbai suburban railway on the Western Line. An extension of the Harbour Line was completed in 2018 because of which it has regular trains to CSMT on the Harbour line. This is in addition to existing trains to Churchgate on the Western Line. Owing to the rapid urbanization (mainly due to construction of metro lines) and growing population of metropolitan Mumbai, Goregaon, which was once merely a hilly forest region is now a crowded suburb of Mumbai.

Mumbai Local Trains originate and terminate at Goregaon. Platforms 1 and 2 operate slow trains towards Churchgate and CSMT whereas Platform 7 operates fast trains towards Churchgate only.

Transport 
Goregaon Railway Station is the transport hub of Goregaon. The station currently has seven platforms, two of which are new harbor-line platforms, and was expanded as a part of the Harbour Line extension (under MUTP 2) from Andheri. The expansion, involving two additional platforms and an elevated deck with passenger amenities (on the western side of the existing station) has been completed in 2018.

A recently constructed skywalk connects one of the foot-over-bridges to S. V. Road near Citi Centre, a shopping complex near the M. G. Road junction.
BEST has bus stations on both western as well as the eastern side of the railway station. Goregaon Depot, however, is located away from the railway station, on the Link Road. The link road has seen an increase in the traffic of late after the commencement of the Mumbai Metro construction work.

There is a new flyover bridge at Ram Mandir road connecting Goregaon West and East. Also Ram Mandir railway station is operational since December 2016. The next important transport project for Goregaon will be the GMLR (Goregaon Mulund Link Road) which will be a 5km underground road consisting of two tunnels each having three lanes. This road will link Goregaon to Bhandup.

The upcoming Metro line (Line 2) between Dahisar to Mankhurd will further improve the connectivity of this western suburb with the far-off eastern suburbs of the city. Currently, this section of the Metro Rail Project is under construction.

Nature and conservation
Goregaon bounds Sanjay Gandhi National Park from the south-western side and is home to the Conservation Education Centre (CEC) run by the Bombay Natural History Society (BNHS). The area is home to a diverse flora and fauna.

Recent development on the eastern side has led to a huge amount of deforestation. Leopard sightings and even the occasional attacks are not very rare and not just in the hamlets inside the Aarey Milk Colony but also in large residential colonies like Nagari Nivara Parishad.

Education

Colleges

 Indira Gandhi Institute of Development Research
 Patkar-Varde College
 Lords Universal College (Topiwala Marg, Goregaon West) 
 Vivek College of Commerce
 Sanskardham College of Science

Schools

 A. B. Goregaonkar English School
 Oberoi International School
 Yashodham high school 
 Ryan International School, Goregaon
 St Thomas High School, Goregaon East
 St Thomas Academy, Goregaon West
 St John's Universal English High School Goregaon West
 Vibgyor High School
 Mount Mary High School
Lakshadham High School
Gokuldham High School
M.T.S.Khalsa High School (Bangur Nagar, Goregaon West) 
Bangur Vidya Bhawan & Junior College

In popular culture
 Fictional setting of 'Gokuldham society' in Taarak Mehta Ka Ooltah Chashmah sitcom is purportedly located in Goregaon.

Film City is located in Goregaon which is predominantly used for most of the Bollywood and Marathi movies.

References

Suburbs of Mumbai
Mumbai Suburban district